Micranthocereus auriazureus is a species of cactus. It is endemic to Brazil, where it is known only from Minas Gerais.

References

Endemic flora of Brazil
auriazureus
Endangered plants
Taxonomy articles created by Polbot